George Thopia (1388 – d. 1392) was the Lord of Durazzo (Durrës) from 1388 to 1392.  He was the son of Karl Topia and Vojislava Balšić. George married Teodora, the daughter of sevastokrator Branko Mladenović, of the Serbian Branković family.

George was required to return Durazzo to the Republic of Venice in 1392. Later that year, he died without issue. His sister, Elena, gained the bulk of the rest of his holdings, whilst a smaller portion was left to his younger sister, Vojsava.

See also

References

Sources 
 

14th-century births
1392 deaths
Gjergj
Medieval Albanian nobility
People from Durrës